Wapato High School is a public high school serving 874 students in grades nine through 12 located in Wapato, Washington, United States. WHS is part of the Wapato School District.  The athletics team is the Wolves.

The school was constructed in the 1950s.  In 2011 voters approved a $20 million bond and the state agreed to provide an additional $23 million to finance the $43 million project which will renovate and expand the existing high school to provide a 177,000 sq.ft. facility.  Construction began in 2012 and was scheduled to be complete by September 2014.

References

External links
 OSPI school report card 2012-2013

Public high schools in Washington (state)
High schools in Yakima County, Washington